The Miss Ecuador 1978, Mabel Cevallos from Guayas, was crowned in 1978 through a casting that was held in Telecentro. She was crowned by Lucía Hernández from Manabí, Miss Ecuador 1977. She competed at Miss Universe 1978, but she did no place. Also, Antonieta Campadonico from Guayas was selected to compete at Miss World 1978.

Result

External links

Miss Ecuador